Glaucocharis preangerella is a moth in the family Crambidae. It was described by David E. Gaskin in 1974. It is found in Indonesia, where it has been recorded from Java.

References

Diptychophorini
Moths described in 1974